Maria Francesca Spatolisano is a diplomat of Italian citizenship who has been serving as Assistant Secretary-General for Policy Coordination and Inter-Agency Affairs in the Department of Economic and Social Affairs by United Nations Secretary-General António Guterres since December 2018, succeeding Thomas Gass.

Early life and education
Spatolisano earned a Doctorate in Law from the University of Florence.

Career
A civil servant for the European Commission since 1985, Spatolisano was the European Union Ambassador to the OECD and UNESCO, Monaco and Andorra and was a member of the Delegation of the European Union to the United Nations.

When Chilean diplomat Fabrizio Hochschild Drummond was suspended from his role as the Secretary-General's Envoy on Technology in 2021, Spatolisano ran his office alongside her other duties.

References

Ambassadors of the European Union to Andorra
Ambassadors of the European Union to Monaco
European civil servants
Italian women ambassadors
Year of birth missing (living people)
Living people
Special Envoys of the Secretary-General of the United Nations